Süleyman Tarık Buğra (2 September 1918 – 26 February 1994) was a Turkish journalist, novelist and short story author. He was well-known author at Republican literature in his country. He was honoured as a State Artist in 1991. Buğra is the father of scientist Ayşe Buğra.

Buğra was born on 2 September 1918 in Akşehir, Konya, son of criminal judge Mehmet Nazım from Erzurum and Nazike from Akşehir. His hometown was effective on Buğra's literatural identity. He preferred to signify this town in most of his works. Buğra graduated from primary school and seconder school in the same town.

Bibliography

Stories 
 Oğlumuz (1949)
 Yarın Diye Bir Şey Yoktur (1952)
 İki Uyku Arasında (1954)
 Hikâyeler (1964, yeni ilavelerle 1969)

Theatre plays 
 Ayakta Durmak İstiyorum
 Akümülatörlü Radyo
 Yüzlerce Çiçek Birden Açtı (1979)

Travel memoirs 
 Gagaringrad (Moskova Notları) (1962)

Essays 
 Gençlik Türküsü (1964)
 Düşman Kazanmak Sanatı (1979)
 Politika Dışı (1992). 
 Bu Çağın Adı (1990)

Novels 
 Siyah Kehribar (1955)
 Küçük Ağa (1954)
 Küçük Ağa Ankarada (1966)
 İbiş'in Rüyası (1970)
 Firavun İmanı (1976)
 Gençliğim Eyvah (1979)
 Dönemeçte (1980)
 Yalnızlar (1981)
 Yağmur Beklerken (1981)
 Osmancık (1973)
 Dünyanın En Pis Sokağı (1989)

Scripts 
 Sıfırdan Doruğa-Patron (1994)

References 

1918 births
1994 deaths
Turkish journalists
Turkish male short story writers
20th-century Turkish short story writers
20th-century Turkish writers
20th-century journalists